Mageina Tovah (born July 26, 1979) is an American actress. She is best known for her roles as Glynis Figliola in the television series Joan of Arcadia (2003–2005), as Ursula Ditkovich in Sam Raimi's Spider-Man trilogy and Zelda Schiff, the head librarian in The Magicians.

Early life
Tovah was born Mageina Tovah Begtrup in Honolulu, Hawaii, where her father was a US Army psychiatrist in the Green Berets, and her mother was an Army physical therapist. Her family later settled for a time in Clarksville, Tennessee, before moving to Nashville. Mageina attended Martin Luther King Junior Magnet High School in Nashville. She skipped a year of high school, taking both her Junior year of honors English and her Senior year of AP English at the same time. She graduated from high school at the age of 16. For college, Mageina started at The California Institute of the Arts, and graduated magna cum laude from USC in three and a half years. She later moved to New York City and Los Angeles. She is Jewish. Her brother, Gavi Begtrup was a candidate in the Cincinnati, Ohio mayoral primary election in 2022.

Career
Tovah had a recurring role on Joan of Arcadia (2003–2005). Her television work also includes guest roles on a number of TV shows. These include Buffy the Vampire Slayer, NYPD Blue, Six Feet Under, The Shield, Cold Case, Shameless, Crossing Jordan, American Horror Story, Private Practice, and The Magicians. Tovah's feature film work includes roles in The SpongeBob SquarePants Movie, Dark Heart, Bickford Shmeckler's Cool Ideas, and a recurring role as Ursula Ditkovich in the films Spider-Man 2 and Spider-Man 3''.

Tovah also made an appearance in the Jonas Åkerlund-directed music video for Christina Aguilera's hit song "Beautiful".

Filmography

Film

Television

References

External links

 
 
 

1979 births
Living people
People from Clarksville, Tennessee
Actresses from Nashville, Tennessee
Actresses from Honolulu
Actresses from Tennessee
American film actresses
American television actresses
Jewish American actresses
California Institute of the Arts alumni
University of Southern California alumni
21st-century American actresses
21st-century American Jews